War Memorial Children's Hospital may refer to the following children's hospitals:

 Children's Hospital at London Health Sciences Centre (known as War Memorial Children's Hospital from 1917 to 1985), London, Ontario, Canada
 Red Cross War Memorial Children's Hospital, Cape Town, Western Cape, South Africa